Güləbird is a village in the Lachin District of Azerbaijan.

History 
The village was located in the Armenian-occupied territories surrounding Nagorno-Karabakh, coming under the control of ethnic Armenian forces in August 1993 during the First Nagorno-Karabakh War. The village subsequently became part of the breakaway Republic of Artsakh as part of its Kashatagh Province, referred to as Tsaghkaberd. It was seized by Azerbaijan on 9 November 2020 during the Lachin offensive in the 2020 Nagorno-Karabakh war.

Economy 

In 2021, the Gulebird hydroelectric power plant was declared reopened. It is a small 8 MW power plant.

Historical heritage sites 
Historical heritage sites in and around the village include a cave, the 12th/13th-century rock-cut church of Kronk, and the 17th/18th-century bridge of Kotrats.

Demographics 
The village had 271 inhabitants in 2005, and 221 inhabitants in 2015.

See also
 List of power stations in Azerbaijan

References

External links 

 

Villages in Azerbaijan 
Populated places in Lachin District
Former Armenian inhabited settlements